is a village located in Aomori, Japan. , the village had an estimated population of 5,913 in 2829 households, and a population density of 20 persons per km² .

Geography
Higashidōri occupies the northeastern coastline of Shimokita Peninsula, facing the Pacific Ocean to the east and Tsugaru Strait to the north, with Cape Shiriya forming a boundary between the two waters.  The low Shimokita Hills run north-south through the center of the village. Mount Kuwabata, the highest point in the village at an elevation of 402 meters. To the west of the Shimokita Hills is the Tanabe Plain, which borders Mutsu City. There are large sand dunes and several swamps near the eastern coast, and many rivers flow to the sea. Hamlets are scattered throughout the coastline of the village, which does not have a well-defined center.  Parts of the village are within the limits of the Shimokita Hantō Quasi-National Park. In the year 2002, the Ministry of the Environment classified some tidal flats of the Higashidōri shoreline to be one of the 500 Important Wetlands in Japan and an important wintering place for Brent geese

Neighbouring municipalities
Aomori Prefecture
Mutsu
Yokohama
Rokkasho

Climate
The village has a cold humid continental climate (Köppen climate classification Dfb) characterized by short, cool summers and long, cold winters with heavy snowfall. The average annual temperature in Higashidōri is 8.6 °C. The average annual rainfall is 1268 mm with September as the wettest month. The temperatures are highest on average in August, at around 21.4 °C, and lowest in January, at around -3.0 °C.

Demographics
Per Japanese census data, the population of Higashidōri peaked around the year 1960 and has declined over the past 60 years.

History
The area around Higashidōri was inhabited by the Emishi people, with archaeological remains dating to the Jōmon period. During the Edo period, it was controlled by the Nambu clan of Morioka Domain, but was a sparsely populated area with scattered fishing hamlets. With the establishment of the modern municipalities system on 1 April 1889, Higashidōri Village was proclaimed from the merger of twelve small hamlets, although the village administrative center was kept within the town hall of neighboring Tanabu Town (now part of the city of Mutsu). In 1988, to celebrate its 100th anniversary as a village, a village hall was finally built within the borders of Higashidōri.

Government
Higashidōri has a mayor-council form of government with a directly elected mayor and a unicameral village council of 14 members. Higashidōri is part of Shimokita District which, together with the city of Mutsu, contributes three members to the Aomori Prefectural Assembly. In terms of national politics, the city is part of Aomori 1st district of the lower house of the Diet of Japan.

Education
Higashidōri has one public elementary school and one public middle school operated by the town government. The village does not have a high school.

Economy
The economy of Higashidōri was traditionally almost completely dependent on commercial fishing. However, since the 1980s, there has been massive investment from Tōhoku Electric Power Company and Tokyo Electric Power Company towards the construction of the Higashidōri Nuclear Power Plant and related support facilities. In addition, the Iwaya Wind Farm, with a total generation capacity of 32.5 MW, is the largest in Japan.

Transportation

Railway
Higashidōri has no passenger railway service. The nearest train station is Shimokita Station on the JR East Ōminato Line.

Highway

Local attractions
Cape Shiriya
Shiriyazaki Lighthouse
Sarugamori Sand Dunes
Hamashiriya Shell Mound, a National Historic Site

References

External links

 

Villages in Aomori Prefecture
Populated coastal places in Japan
Higashidōri, Aomori